Ahmadhiyya International School, previously known as Madhrasathul Ahmadhiyaa, is a Maldivian private school, which is located very close to the well known Billabong High International School.

The school he started with 60 students is now one of the topmost schools of Maldives. The school is the official school of Machangoalhi, one of the wards (districts) of Malé, and is run by the Machangoalhi Ward Office.

History of Ahmadhiyya 
President Maumoon Abdul Gayyoom met with some high ranking private entrepreneurs at Iskandhar School. Discussion sparked among them to plan the construction of a school for the children from Machchangolhi Ward, unable to attend school due to various reasons should be given the opportunity to do so. As a result, when a request was made to the president for the acquisition of a plot of land, an area of 8000sq feet was allocated soon after the land-filling projects to fuel the ever growing population of Male'

The foundation of the school was laid down by His Excellency Maumoon Abdul Gayyom on 4 June 1979. After construction time of two years, eight months and 18 days. The school was finally opened to the public on 21 February 1982 once again by the President of the Maldives. The school opens with just eight classes, an administration office, a small office for the Machchangolhi Ward Community, a water tank and three toilets. All these services were implemented thanks to the financial help from Mr. Ahmed Didi.

When the school was first open, it was made to be exclusively for the Machchangolhi Ward children whom were too poor to afford studying in other ward schools with only few seats allocated for students from other wards. After much pressure from the residents in other wards, Dr. Ahmed Didi allowed for anyone and everyone to study here. Right after this change, many students from all around Male' flocked into Ahmadhiyya. This was when the school was given the title of the most populated school in Maldives with an student population of over 200.

Dr. Ahmed Didi and his wife Mrs. Saeeda Ibrahim provided all the 200 students with up to date textbooks, uniforms and stationary. After studying for two years in the school, students were exempted from paying anything until their studies were over.

However, with even more students enrolling into Ahmadhiyya, congestion issues began to happen. Eventually, the government provided a plot of land that was 4000sq which made the total area of the school approximately 12000 square feet.

During this expansion plan, a three-story building containing of 15 classrooms was constructed in the west along with another three story building facing the south which increased the total class count to 28 classes. Existing facilities of the school were also upgraded such as a larger hall which had the capacity of fitting 300 students, two AV rooms, one fully equipped ICT lab, along with two prayer rooms, one each for boys and girls.

When the year 2015 came, the schools went through a re branding effort, from Madhrasathul Ahmadhiyya to the now known name of Ahmadhiyya International School. During this time, many new career choices was introduced to the higher secondary students with three new language brought into the syllabus, Arabic, French and Chinese. Once again, many upgrades were taking place such as air-conditioning the student hall, all student classrooms and laboratories. The introduction of a brand new play set for kindergarten children along with the installation of a public announcement system on all floors.

Around late 2017 to the end of 2018, a brand new building began construction that was an extension to the kindergarten classes. When the construction of this new building was completed at the beginning of 2019, many facilities for the lower grades were given. A multipurpose hall, 9 more classes to add for the increasing number of students, an addition prayer room to utilize the old one for 2 addition classrooms. This infrastructure also aided the school to introduce new grade classes and gain extra space sacrificing the compound area size.

Infrastructure 
Ahmadhiyya stands on a plot of land around 12000 square feet which is quite small compared to other schools land area in Maldives. Ahmadhiyya has two buildings, the western building and the southern building with the southern one being supported by a secondary building. There are two entrances made for both boys and girls respectively. The boys gate faces into the football field used by the preschool children and youths alike along with a parking lot designed to hold more than 150 motorbikes. There is a small exercise zone that is connected to the football field as well. Cars are prohibited from driving on the adjacent roads next to gates and are closely monitored by the Maldives Police Service during school times.

Admission 
A student planning to continue studying here must take an admission exam. Firstly, a background check is made on the student if there were any prior suspensions or expulsion activities. When clear, the student's previous three years of academic results are scanned. If the student passes through the criteria, he is given a unique index number and a class to join to. Documents on fee prices, textbooks and uniform fabric are also handed out.

All the grades follow the same academic year pattern.

Class schedule 
School sessions in Ahmadhiyya are divided into two. There is the morning session and the afternoon session.  

The morning session takes place from 7 in the morning to 12.45 in the afternoon. Students from Grade 7 and 10 along with preschool children are required to attend this session. 

The afternoon session takes place from 1 in the afternoon to 5. During this time, higher secondary students and kindergarten children are required to attend. 

Ahmadhiyya also has established night class schedules for exam preparation and per student demand.

Education system 
Ahmadhiyya has a custom syllabus that is made specially for the kindergarten and preschool children up to UKG. Afterwards, it is changed to the current Maldivian Syllabus followed to Grade 7. The Cambridge International General Certificate of Secondary Education (IGCSE) is then followed in Grade 8,9 and 10. A final exam takes places beginning at October and ending midway into November. Maldivians also has the Secondary School Certificate (SSC) Syllabus which includes the subjects Islam and Dhivehi with Quran recently being removed from the syllabus.

After O' Level's, Edexel A' Levels are continued with a final exam conducted on the end of the year for Grade 11 and 12.

Uniform code 
The uniform consists of black shoes and socks, the exact fabric sample given by the school as the torso with white short sleeves. This is not true for the students studying grade 11 and 12 where it is replaced with gray long sleeves. A black pair of pants are also part of the code. Students are advised to cut their hair every two to three months and trim any facial hair. This rule still applies to higher secondary but are allowed to grow their facial hair up to a certain limit.

For girls, the same white sleeves and torso pattern applies. But the trousers are replaced with black tights that are around 1-2 cm loose from the actual leg width. A gray hijab is also recommended to wear. If the student is unable to get a gray hijab, slight variation is accepted but only to that reason. For non-hijab girls, a gray ribbon is strongly advised to wear.

An activity uniform is available to both boys and girls which are almost identical. Black pants with green strips from hip to feet. Torso with the top half white and the bottom half dark gray. The sleeves are short. One fourth of the top sleeve is white while the rest is dark gray to match the torso.

Failure to follow these rules can lead to the student being sent home.

Principals 
Throughout 38 years of the school standing, there has been a total of six principals that have served the school.

 Mr. Abdul Rasheed Ali, he is the first ever principal of Ahmadhiyya who served from 21 February 1892 up to 15 August 1892. He once again   served the school from 23 December 1986 to 9 July 1989.
 Mr. Copee Mohmmad Rasheed, the second principal to serve the school from 16 August 1982 to 22 December 1986.
 Mr. Abdul Sameeu Hassan, the fourth principal to serve the school. He served from 10 July 1989 all the way to 18 May 2000. During the 11 years he served the school, Sameeu introduced the system where O' Level Examinations were provided to the Grade 10. He also introduced full-time teacher jobs. During this time of school improvements, the school was given the title of being the Most Progressive School.\
 Mr. Ahmed Saeed (sometimes known as Gahaa), the fifth principal to serve the school who served from 18 May 2000 to 29 August 2004. During his time, the school was achieving the best resulting in the Cambridge O' Level which the title still stands to this day.
 Mr. Hassan Nashid, the sixth principal of the school who served from 9 August 2004 to 15 October 2006. He provided the fame of the school which made Ahmadhiyya inhabited with islanders from all around Maldives.
 Mr. Mohamed Rasheed, the seventh and current principal of Ahmadhiyya, who have been serving the school since 28 October 2006 making it the longest time an individual has served the role of principal in Ahmadhiyya history. He introduced many new features such as extra classes and tuition for weaker students. Rasheed began his journey of principal by joining as a teacher right after the debut of the school. His great determination, dedication and commitment gave him the title of Assistant Principal. not long after, he was promoted to Senior Principal and finally, into his Principal role.

Controversy 
The biggest controversy that is present on Ahmadhiyya is the feud between students and teachers. Students have always complained about the lack of space and the recent addition to the southern building has further escalated this problem. Teachers have also complained about the students not cooperating with them. Many of the time, this is usually a problem from the students' side but many incidents have occurred that resulted in teachers quitting their jobs. Furthermore, the development of Ahmadhiyya purely stands on the grades from IGCSE O' Level results which creates unbelievable amounts of stress that can affect students greatly. This can also cause students of lower grades to feel abandoned as if their results do not matter at all.

Some parents also report the uses of clubs in Ahmadhiyya, since academic success has been a major factor in the success of Ahmadhiyya, the branch of clubs has been largely kept abandoned without many activities making it almost obsolete to even have specific ranks representing the clubs.although, continued complaints from students has instigated the student management body of the school to give way in the students' study timetables for extra curricular events such as the school cadet corps and various club activities

There has also been talk about how outdated the Ahmadhiyya website is. Many of the features are broken and major events that have taken place from 2018 are left to be forgotten without anything about it even remotely mentioned. If the official website of the school becomes this deprived of crucial information, it may affect the parent's view of this school.

References

Schools in the Maldives
Cambridge schools in the Maldives
Malé